Templemore College may refer to two institutions in Templemore, County Tipperary, Ireland:

 Templemore College of Further Education, with a variety of courses for the general public
 Garda Síochána College, the training college for the Irish police